Jack Clifford (born 12 February 1993) is a former rugby union player for the England national rugby union team and Premiership side Harlequins. Clifford played in the back row at flanker or number 8.  He first captained Harlequins in November 2015 in a match against Cardiff Blues

Club career
Clifford began playing rugby age 11 for Cranleigh Mini's and Cobham youths before joining Harlequins Academy two years later. He played for Cobham Rugby club from age 13 in which they had a five-year unbeaten record. He was dual registered with National League 1 side Ealing Trailfinders for the 2011–12 season and made his first appearance in senior rugby on 7 January 2012 against Jersey. He joined Esher on a similar agreement the following season and also made his senior debut for Harlequins in November 2012 as a replacement in the 31–30 Anglo-Welsh Cup win over Northampton Saints. In 2013 he re-joined Ealing on dual registration terms.

He was forced to retire through injury in August 2020.

International career
Born in Brisbane, Australia to a Kenyan father and an English mother, Clifford has captained England under-18 and under-20 level. This included England's victory in the Under-20s 
World Cup in 2013.

In March 2014 he was named in the England Sevens squad for two legs of the Sevens World Series in Japan and Hong Kong. In May 2015 he was selected for an England XV to play against the Barbarians. Clifford scored a try in the match.

Clifford received his first call up to the senior England squad by new coach Eddie Jones on 13 January 2016 for the 2016 Six Nations Championship.

He made his full debut as a replacement for Chris Robshaw during the Calcutta Cup match against Scotland on 6 February 2016 after 69 minutes.

International tries

References

External links

Profile  at Harlequin F.C.
Profile at the RFU
Career statistics at Statbunker

1993 births
Living people
Sportsmen from Queensland
English rugby union players
English people of Kenyan descent
Rugby union flankers
Rugby union number eights
Harlequin F.C. players
Ealing Trailfinders Rugby Club players
Esher RFC players
People educated at Royal Grammar School, Guildford
Rugby union players from Brisbane
England international rugby union players